George Philips Alexander Sinclair, 15th Earl of Caithness (30 November 1858 – 28 May 1889), was a Scottish aristocrat.

Life
George Sinclair was the eldest son of James Sinclair, 14th Earl of Caithness and his first wife Louisa Georgiana Philips. He was educated privately and at Magdalene College, Cambridge. On 28 March 1881 he succeeded his father as Earl of Caithness and 2nd Baron Barrogill. He served as Lord Lieutenant of Caithness from 1881 until his death in 1889.

Suffering from epilepsy throughout his short life, his illness killed him at the age of 30. He died following an epileptic seizure at the Palace Hotel in Edinburgh. He never married and did not have any children. By his will, the 15th Earl bequeathed the Castle of Mey and its lands and estates out of the hands of the Sinclairs leaving the future Earls of Caithness without a family seat. He left it all to his friend, Mr F. G. Heathcote on the condition that he legally took the name of Sinclair (which he did) and that he lived in the Castle for at least 3 months of each year (which he also did).

References

 Mosley, Charles (ed.), Burke's Peerage, Baronetage & Knightage, 107th Edition, Wilmington, Delaware, 2003, vol I, p. 645, 
 The Peerage.com

External links

1858 births
1889 deaths
Alumni of Magdalene College, Cambridge
Lord-Lieutenants of Caithness
Earls of Caithness